Judicial murder is the intentional and premeditated killing of an innocent person by means of capital punishment; therefore, it is a subset of wrongful execution. The Oxford English Dictionary describes it as "death inflicted by process of law, capital punishment, esp. considered to be unjust or cruel".

Example
An early case in which charges of judicial murder were raised was the Amboyna massacre in 1623, which caused a legal dispute between the English and Dutch governments over the conduct of a court in the Dutch East Indies that had ordered the execution of ten English men accused of treason. The dispute centered around differing interpretations of the legal jurisdiction of the court in question. The English believed that this court had not been competent to try and execute these EIC members, and so believed the executions to have been fundamentally illegal, thus constituting "judicial murder". The Dutch, on the other hand, believed the court to have been fundamentally competent, and wished to focus instead on misconduct of the particular judges in the court.

Uses of the term in legal discourse and literature
Another early use of the term occurs in Northleigh's Natural Allegiance of 1688; "He would willingly make this Proceeding against the Knight but a sort of Judicial Murder".

In 1777 Voltaire used the comparable term of assassins juridiques ("judicial murderers").

The term was used in German (Justizmord) in 1782  by August Ludwig von Schlözer in reference to the execution of Anna Göldi. In a footnote, he explains the term as

In 1932, the term is also used by Justice Sutherland in Powell v. Alabama when establishing the right to a court-appointed attorney in all capital cases:

Let us suppose the extreme case of a prisoner charged with a capital offense who is deaf and dumb, illiterate and feeble minded, unable to employ counsel, with the whole power of the state arrayed against him, prosecuted by counsel for the state without assignment of counsel for his defense, tried, convicted and sentenced to death. Such a result … if carried into execution, would be little short of judicial murder.

Hermann Mostar (1956) defends the extension of the term to un-premeditated miscarriages of justice where an innocent suffers the death penalty.

Show trials
The term is often applied to show trials that result in a death penalty, and has been applied to the deaths of Nikolai Bukharin, Milada Horáková, the eleven people executed after the Slansky trial and Zulfikar Ali Bhutto.

See also
 Extrajudicial murder

References

Murder
Wrongful executions